Ekuona is one of the eight major Akan clans.

Totem
The totem of the Ekuona people is the buffalo.

Major towns
The major towns of the Ekuona include Adansi Berekum, Asokore Mampong Duayaw Nkwanta Asokore, Kokofu Asamang, Afare,Pekyi,Berekum etc.

References

Ghanaian culture
Akan people